Man-Eater of Kumaon is a 1948 American adventure film directed by Byron Haskin and starring Sabu, Wendell Corey and Joy Page. The film was made after the success of the Jim Corbett book Man-Eaters of Kumaon, published in 1944.

The film was not based on any of the stories of the Corbett's bestselling book, but used a fictional plot. The film was a flop, although some interesting footage of the tiger was filmed. Corbett is known to have said that "the best actor was the tiger".

Plot

Dr. John Collins visits India, where he learns from native couple Narain and Lali during a tiger hunt.

Cast

References

External links

1948 films
1948 adventure films
Films directed by Byron Haskin
Films about tigers
Films set in Uttarakhand
Films scored by Hans J. Salter
American adventure films
American black-and-white films
Films set in India
Kumaon division
Films based on non-fiction books
Tigers in India
1940s American films